Alireza Heidari (born March 4, 1976, in Tehran) is a retired Iranian wrestler who competed in the Men's Freestyle 96 kg at the 2004 Summer Olympics and won the bronze medal.

He also competed in Sydney 2000, where he placed 6th. He is also a seven-time Asian champion and has won a gold medal, three silver medals and a bronze medal at World Championships. Heidari was selected as the 1999 National Sportsman of the Year in Iran.

He has a sister and three brothers.

After his retirement, he bought a mine with nearly eight hundred employees.

Results

References

External links 
 
 
 Picture of Alireza Heidari

1976 births
Living people
Olympic wrestlers of Iran
Wrestlers at the 2000 Summer Olympics
Iranian male sport wrestlers
Wrestlers at the 2004 Summer Olympics
Olympic bronze medalists for Iran
Asian Games gold medalists for Iran
Olympic medalists in wrestling
Asian Games medalists in wrestling
Wrestlers at the 1998 Asian Games
Wrestlers at the 2002 Asian Games
Wrestlers at the 2006 Asian Games
Medalists at the 2004 Summer Olympics
World Wrestling Championships medalists
Medalists at the 1998 Asian Games
Medalists at the 2002 Asian Games
Medalists at the 2006 Asian Games
20th-century Iranian people
21st-century Iranian people
World Wrestling Champions